Arthur John Gimblett (1889–1957) was a Welsh professional footballer who played as a winger.

References

1889 births
1957 deaths
Footballers from Merthyr Tydfil
Welsh footballers
Association football wingers
Merthyr Town F.C. players
Grimsby Town F.C. players
English Football League players